Prespatou is a settlement in British Columbia. It is located approximately 100 km north of Fort St John. It is a community with the majority of the residents being German-speaking mennonites. It has a convenience store, gas station, and a public school with both elementary grades and secondary grades.

Designated places in British Columbia
Settlements in British Columbia